Kahimi Karie is a compilation album by Japanese musician Kahimi Karie. It was released on September 8, 1998 by Minty Fresh in the United States, serving as her debut album in the country. Kahimi Karie primarily consists of tracks from Karie's previous EPs and singles, excepting one track taken from her 1997 debut album Larme de Crocodile. It utilizes the cover art from Karie's 1995 EP My First Karie.

In Japan, The Best of Trattoria Years Plus More, an equivalent compilation featuring an identical track listing to Kahimi Karie, was released on September 30, 1998 by Trattoria Records.

Track listing
Songwriting credits are adapted from the liner notes of The Best of Trattoria Years Plus More.

Notes

Charts

The Best of Trattoria Years Plus More

References

External links
 
 

1998 compilation albums
Kahimi Karie albums
Minty Fresh Records albums